Elaine Saunders may refer to:

 Elaine Pritchard (1926–2012), née Saunders, English chess player
 Elaine Saunders (scientist), Australian academic and entrepreneur